The Gachalá Emerald, one of the most valuable and famous emeralds in the world, was found in 1967, in the mine called Vega de San Juan, located in Gachala, a town in Colombia, located  from Bogota. Gachalá Chibcha means "place of Gacha." Presently the emerald is in the United States, where it was donated to the Smithsonian Institution by the New York City jeweler, Harry Winston.

Symbolism 
The emerald was named in honor of Gachalá, the municipality of Cundinamarca where it was found.

Characteristics 
 Shape: Emerald
 Color: Intense green
 Carats: 858 Carats
 Weight: 172 grams
 Size: 5 centimeters
 Year of extraction: 1967

Conservation 
The emerald is part of the permanent collection of the Smithsonian Institution in Washington, D.C. It was donated in 1969 by the American jeweler Harry Winston, and is labeled under number 122078 in the catalog.

See also 

 Colombian emeralds
 Chivor
 List of individual gemstones
 List of emeralds by size

References

External links 

 Digital article from the Colombian Newspaper El Diario
  Emerald history of Colombia
 Gachalá Emerald

Natural history of Colombia
Jewellery in the collection of the Smithsonian Institution
Individual emeralds
Colombian emeralds
Muysccubun